Stellar drift, or the motion of stars, is a necessary result of the lack of an absolute reference frame in special relativity.

Nothing in space stands still—more precisely, standing still is meaningless without defining what "still" means. Most galaxies have been moving away ever since the Big Bang, as explained by the metric expansion of space. Galaxy motion is also influenced by galaxy groups and clusters. Stars orbit moving galaxies, and they also orbit moving star clusters and companion stars. Planets orbit their moving stars.

Stellar drift is measured by two components: proper motion (multiplied by distance) and radial velocity. Proper motion is a star's motion across the sky, slowly changing the shapes of constellations over thousands of years. It can be measured using a telescope to detect small movements over long periods of time. Radial velocity is how fast a star approaches or recedes from us. It is measured using redshift. Both components are complicated by the Earth's orbit around the Sun, so the motions of stars are described relative to the Sun, not the Earth (kinematics of stars).

See also
Gravitational wave

Drift